The green-backed robin (Pachycephalopsis hattamensis) is a species of bird in the family Petroicidae.
It is found in New Guinea.
Its natural habitats are subtropical or tropical moist lowland forest and subtropical or tropical moist montane forest.

References

green-backed robin
Birds of New Guinea
green-backed robin
Taxonomy articles created by Polbot